Paul Davies (born 1979) is an Australian artist working in Los Angeles.  Paul Davies work consists of painting and sculpture, created from hand-cut stencils, based in turn on the artists’ own digital photographs.

Biography
Davies spent his childhood on NSW coast, before moving to Sydney. Davies' interest in art began when he was only 7 years old, inspired by drawing Asterix cartoons and Australian artist Jeffrey Smart.

Education
 Masters by Research UNSW College of Fine Arts, 2011–2014.
 Painting Master Class, National Art School, 2006.
 Bachelor of Fine Arts, UNSW College of Fine Arts College of Fine Art, 2000.
 Artist Residency, Cité internationale des arts in Paris, 2013
 Artist Residency, Taliesin west Frank Lloyd Wright school of architecture, Phoenix, Arizona, 2016

References

External links
 Paul Davies Artist Site
 Vogue Exhibitions to See, 2015
 Work in Sydney Show, Australian Financial Review Post 2015
 Limbo Architecture – Aaron Betsky, The Architectural Review, 2014
 Art Meets Architecture – Kate Lawson Huffington Post, 2014
 Built in Translation – Colin Martin Architecture AU, Houses, 2014
 Introducing Paul Davies – Stephanie Samuel, The Wall Magazine, 2014
 Interview: Paul Davies Jessica Cheng, Tatler, Hong Kong, 2013
 Sublime Modernism – Philippa Day, Habitus Living, 2013
 Painting Down Under: Artist Paul Davies – Timothy McCahill, W Magazine 2011

1979 births
Living people
Australian artists
Artists from Sydney
University of New South Wales College of Fine Arts alumni
National Art School alumni
Artists from Los Angeles